Govindrao Rathod (death 26 October 2014) was a member of the 13th Maharashtra Legislative Assembly. He represented the Mukhed Assembly Constituency. He belonged to the Bharatiya Janata Party (BJP). He died soon after being elected & without swearing-in. He was 62 at the time of his death.

Career
Rathod was a long time member of the Indian National Congress. He was twice president of the Mukhed Municipal Council and a member of the Nanded Zilla Parishad. He joined the BJP, before the October, 2014 Assembly elections. In October, 2014 he was elected to the state assembly.

Death
On 28 October 2014, Rathod was travelling to Mumbai by the train Devagiri Express, he complained of chest pain and suffered a heart attack around 10.30 pm, near Jalna, he was taken to a hospital in Jalna, but was declared dead on arrival.

References

Maharashtra MLAs 2014–2019
Bharatiya Janata Party politicians from Maharashtra
2014 deaths
1952 births
People from Nanded district
Maharashtra district councillors